Ahangaran (also Romanized as Āhangarān and Āhangirān; also known as Āhangarān-e Soflá) is a village in Doab Rural District, in the Central District of Selseleh County, Lorestan Province, Iran. At the 2006 census, its population was 365, in 67 families.

References 

Towns and villages in Selseleh County